Stanisław Jałowiecki (born 26 December 1946 in Tanvald) is a Polish politician and Member of the European Parliament for the Lower Silesian Voivodship & Opole Voivodship with the Civic Platform, part of the European People's Party and sits on the European Parliament's Committee on Transport and Tourism.

Jałowiecki is a substitute for the Committee on Regional Development and a member of
the Delegation to the EU-Turkey Joint Parliamentary Committee.

Education
 1970: Master of Sociology Jagiellonian University, Kraków (UJ)
 1975: Doctor of Humanities, UJ

Career
 1970-1975: Lecturing at the Silesian Technical University, Gliwice
 1997-1998: the Institute of Sociology and Demography at the Śląsk Institute, Opole (1975-1981
 1984-1996: Free-lance journalist in U.S., journalist and Deputy director for Radio Free Europe in Munich (1985-1994) and Warsaw
 since 2000: Researcher at the Silesian University
 1981-1983: Chairman of the Regional Administration and member of the National Committee of 'Solidarność'
 1998-2002: Marshal of the Opole Voivodship
 since 2003: Vice-Chairman of the Mountain Areas Association

See also
2004 European Parliament election in Poland

External links
 
 
 

1946 births
Living people
Civic Platform MEPs
MEPs for Poland 2004–2009
Voivodeship marshals of Poland
Opole Voivodeship